Hero Worship was Hal Crook's fifth album as a leader, and the second album he released for RAM Records.

This album was Crook's first recording using the 5-voice digital harmonizer, which connected to a microphone attached to his trombone's bell. The harmonizer generate up to 5 additional "voices" at preset intervals, which allowed Crook to play chordal lines using an otherwise multiphonic instrument. The early-generation harmonizer did not distinguish between major and minor intervals, which created a distinctive effect.

Track listing 
Noticed Moments — 3:44
Bluezo — 7:25
A Simpler Time — 8:57
Night and Day — 7:13
Teen Mind — 8:46
Cathedral Song — 2:59
My Funny Valentine — 6:42
Hero Worship — 8:22
Falling Grace — 5:11
You Do Something To Me — 7:47

Personnel
Hal Crook — trombone, 5-voice digital harmonizer
Mick Goodrick — guitar
Paul Motian — drums

References

1997 albums
Hal Crook albums